Ritam Kundu (born 26 November 1983) is an Indian former cricketer. He played ten first-class matches for Bengal between 2004 and 2008.

See also
 List of Bengal cricketers

References

External links
 

1983 births
Living people
Indian cricketers
Bengal cricketers
People from Hooghly district
Cricketers from West Bengal